Joseph O'Leary may refer to:

Joseph S. O'Leary (born 1949), Irish Roman Catholic theologian
Joseph V. O'Leary (1890–1964), American politician

See also
Joe O'Leary (1883–1963), New Zealand rugby union player